The women's road race took place at 26 March 2006 on a route through the Royal Botanic Gardens. The race length was 100 km.

Results
The notation "s.t." indicates that the rider crossed the finish line in the same group as the one receiving the time above her, and was therefore credited with the same finishing time.

External links
 Results

Cycling at the 2006 Commonwealth Games
2006 in women's road cycling
Road cycling at the Commonwealth Games